Boban Cenić (born November 13, 1981) is a Serbian former footballer who played as a defender.

Born in Leskovac, he played top level football in Serbia with Radnički Niš and Mladi Radnik. In 2010, he played in the Romanian Liga I at Universitatea Cluj.

References

External links

 Boban Cenić Stats at Utakmica.rs

1981 births
Living people
Sportspeople from Leskovac
Serbian footballers
FK Mladi Radnik players
FK Novi Pazar players
FK Radnički Niš players
FK Banat Zrenjanin players
Serbian SuperLiga players
FC Universitatea Cluj players
Liga I players
Expatriate footballers in Romania
Association football defenders